Cnidoscolus regina, synonym Victorinia regina, is a species of plant in the family Euphorbiaceae. It is endemic to Cuba.

References

Manihoteae
Endemic flora of Cuba
Critically endangered plants
Taxonomy articles created by Polbot